Mélissa Corbo (born June 2, 1990) is a Canadian freestyle skier specializing in aerials. She won a bronze medal at the FIS Freestyle Ski World Cup in Lake Placid on January 30, 2015.

References

External links
FIS-Ski.com Profile

Living people
1990 births
Canadian female freestyle skiers